The third season of the Fox television series Sleepy Hollow premiered on October 1, 2015, and consisted of 18 episodes. This season it moved time slots to Thursdays at 9:00 pm. On February 5, 2016, the show premiered in its new timeslot of Friday at 8:00 pm.

Cast and characters

Main cast
 Tom Mison as Ichabod Crane
 Nicole Beharie as Special Agent Abigail "Abbie" Mills
 Lyndie Greenwood as Jennifer "Jenny" Mills
 Nikki Reed as Betsy Ross
 Zach Appelman as Joe Corbin
 Lance Gross as Special Agent Daniel Reynolds
 Jessica Camacho as Special Agent Sophie Foster
 Shannyn Sossamon as Pandora

Recurring cast
 Peter Mensah as the Hidden One
 Maya Kazan as Zoe Corinth
 Bill Irwin as Atticus Nevins
 James McDaniel as Ezra Mills

Guest cast

 Clancy Brown as Sheriff August Corbin
 Charles Aitken as Dr. Japeth Leeds
 Anthony K. Hyatt as Randall Martin
 Alexander Ward as Marcus Collins (a.k.a. The Whispering Wraith) / The Ghoul / Zombie
 Mark Campbell as George Washington
 Michael O'Keefe as FBI Director Jack Walters
 Marti Matulis as the Yaoguai / the Verslinder
 Craig Branham and Jeremy Owens as the Headless Horseman
 Dustin Lewis as Paul Revere
 Nicholas Guest as General William Howe
 Derek Mears as the Head Berserker / the Kindred
 C. Thomas Howell as Special Agent Mick Granger
 John Paul Marston as Colonel Prescott
 Charlene Amoia as Susan James
 Andy Pessoa as Young Ichabod
 Onira Tarés as Grace Dixon
 Robin Strasds as Daniel Boone
 Richard Kohlberger as Johnny Revere
 Katie Malia as Onryō
 Griffin Freeman as Nathan Hale
 Kelly Bellini as the Kindress
 Morgan Ayres as Young August Corbin
 Drew Matthews as Young Atticus Nevins
 C.C. Ice as Banshee
 Brad Ashten as Francis Scott Key
 Dan B. Norris as the Eternal Soldier

Special guest stars
 Emily Deschanel as Dr. Temperance "Bones" Brennan
 David Boreanaz as  FBI Special Agent Seeley Booth

Episodes

Production

Casting
On July 15, 2015 it was announced that Nikki Reed had joined the cast in a series regular role as Betsy Ross, an old flame of Ichabod. Also joining the cast is Shannyn Sossamon who is set to play Pandora, a mysterious new presence in Sleepy Hollow who seeks the assistance of Ichabod and Abbie. Jessica Camacho who plays the role of Sophia Foster, was also upgraded to series regular this season.

It was also announced that Orlando Jones would not be reprising his role this season, and that Neil Jackson would not be appearing as the Headless Horseman this season, due to the creative changes made to the show by the new showrunner.

Filming
Production was moved from Wilmington, North Carolina when the state scrapped the tax credits incentive, to Atlanta, Georgia where it was reported that the show will receive 30% tax credits.

Crossover with Bones
A crossover event with Bones aired on October 29, 2015. It consists of two parts, with characters from both shows appearing in both episodes. The two episodes are linked by the use of the corpse of General William Howe, the British commander during the American Revolution; his skull is revealed to have essentially served as the murder weapon in Bones and he is reanimated by Pandora to serve as a weapon against Crane in Sleepy Hollow.

Reception

Ratings

References

External links

2015 American television seasons
2016 American television seasons